Georgia Hulls (born 27 August 1999) is a New Zealand sprinter with multiple national and Oceania titles who has represented her country at the World Athletics Championships.

Early life
Hulls is from Hawke's Bay where she attended Havelock North High School. She competed for New Zealand in Cali, Colombia at the 2015 World Youth Championships in Athletics and at the 2016 IAAF World U20 Championships held in Bydgoszcz, Poland.

Career
Hulls moved to live in Auckland to study accounting at Massey University’s Academy of Sport and to train with a cluster of New Zealand’s young aspiration athletes based there. In her first year as a senior athlete she won the 2019 New Zealand national championships title over 400 metres before finishing as runner-up to Zoe Hobbs in the 200m the following day. With Hobbs, Natasha Eady and Olivia Eaton, Hulls won bronze in the 4x100m relay at the Athletics at the 2019 Summer Universiade held in Napoli, Italy.

Hulls ran a personal best 200m time of 23.17 seconds to win the Australian championships on 2 April 2022. She had ran a wind assisted 200m in 23.10 to win the New Zealand 200m national championships the previous month. Hulls won gold in the 200m and the 4x400m relay at the 2022 Oceania Athletics Championships, this came after winning bronze in the 100m race at the 2019 Oceania Athletics Championships. Hulls competed for New Zealand at the 2022 World Athletics Championships held in Portland, Oregon.

On February 19, 2023 Hulls lowered her personal best 200m time, running 22.84 at the International Track Meet in Christchurch.

Personal life
Her grandmother Jean Hulls (nee Adamson) was among Britain’s best multi-discipline athletes winning silver medals in the pentathlon at the England women’s athletics championship in 1958 and 1959.

References

Living people
 1999 births
New Zealand female sprinters
World Athletics Championships athletes for New Zealand
Australian Athletics Championships winners
Universiade medalists in athletics (track and field)
Universiade bronze medalists for New Zealand